The Valley of Vanishing Men is a 1942 American Western film serial. It was the 20th of 57 released by Columbia Pictures. Directed by Spencer Gordon Bennet, it stars Bill Elliott, Slim Summerville, and Carmen Morales.

Plot
In this serial,  Wild Bill Tolliver and Missouri Benson are a pair of adventurers who ride into the vast New Mexico Territory in search of Bill's father, Henry Tolliver, who mysteriously disappeared while prospecting for gold. They soon discover that a ruthless outlaw leader, Jonathan Kincaid, owns an immense mine of gold in which he uses captured Mexican patriots, among others, to work as slaves in the mine. They also learn that Kincaid has joined forces with Colonel Carl Engler, a renegade eastern European soldier, to carry out his cruel intentions. Then Bill and Missouri meet with Consuelo Ramírez, a diligent Mexican agent, who informs them that Bill's father is among the prisoners in the mine. After that, the heroes find themselves in a conflict with the outlaws in the middle of incessant fights, chases and action.

Cast
 Bill Elliott as Wild Bill Tolliver. Bill Elliott starred in three serials at Columbia Pictures, and The Valley of Vanishing Men was his last cliffhanger at that studio or anywhere else. Shortly after making this chapterplay, Elliott signed with Republic Pictures where his contract excluded him from doing any more serial work.
 Slim Summerville as Missouri Benson
 Carmen Morales as Consuelo Ramírez

Production
Writing about the film's atmosphere, Cline says that this serial was a "grim tale...[with a] mood of ominous dread."  Missouri was added to the cast because a normal comedy relief character would have not have worked.

Chapter titles
 Trouble in Canyon City
 The Mystery of Ghost Town
 Danger Walks by night
 Hillside Horror
 Guns in the Night
 The Bottomless Well
 The Man in the Gold Mask
 When the Devil Drives
 The Traitor's Shroud
 Death Strikes at Seven
 Satan in the Saddle
 The Mine of Missing Men
 Danger on Dome Rock
 The Door that Has No Key
 Empire's End
Source:

See also
List of film serials by year
List of film serials by studio

References

External links
 
 The Valley of Vanishing Men at Cinefania.com
 

1942 films
American black-and-white films
Columbia Pictures film serials
1940s English-language films
Films about missing people
Films directed by Spencer Gordon Bennet
Films set in ghost towns
Films set in New Mexico
1942 Western (genre) films
American Western (genre) films
Films with screenplays by Harry L. Fraser
1940s American films